Les Anglais, French for "The English", is a commune in the Chardonnières Arrondissement, in the Sud department of Haiti. It has 27,182 inhabitants. The eye of Hurricane Matthew made landfall near Les Anglais on 4 October 2016 at 6 a.m. EST (11:00 a.m. UTC) as a powerful Category 4 hurricane with winds of 230 km/h (145 mph).

Settlements

References

Populated places in Sud (department)
Communes of Haiti